Adam Ross Menzies (born 31 October 1934) is a Scottish former professional footballer who played as a wing half.

Career
Born in Rutherglen, Menzies began his career at Armadale Thistle in 1953. He then played for Rangers, making 3 Cup appearances in September 1954, before moving to Cardiff City in August 1957, for whom he made 1 Football League appearance. He then played for Cheltenham Town.

He also played for Scotland schools.

References

1934 births
Living people
Scottish footballers
Armadale Thistle F.C. players
Rangers F.C. players
Cardiff City F.C. players
Cheltenham Town F.C. players
English Football League players
Association football wing halves